Gregoire Lake 176B is an Indian reserve of the Fort McMurray First Nation in Alberta, located within the Regional Municipality of Wood Buffalo.

References

Regional Municipality of Wood Buffalo
Indian reserves in Alberta